7B (Russian: 7Б) is a Russian rock band based in Moscow. They have released five studio albums, several reprints and collections.

History 
The official birthday of "7B" is March 8, 2001. This is the date of commencement of work on the debut album "Young wind."

In 2022, the band supported Russian invasion ("special military operation") of Ukraine by a concert in Moscow. They further participated in a series of concerts organized in order to support the invasion.

Members 
 Ivan Demyan—vocals, acoustic guitar, author of music and words, the group leader
 Andrew "Said" Prosvetov—bass
 Andrew "Pushkin" Belov—electric and acoustic guitars
 Stanislav Tsybulsky—keyboards, portable studio
 Andrew "Katalych" Katalkin—drums, percussion
Peter Losev—sound
 Igor Chernyshev—Director

Discography

Albums 
 2001 — Molodye Vetra (Молодые ветра; Young Winds)
 2004 — Inoplaneten (Инопланетен; Extraterrestrial)
 2005 — Otrazhatel (Отражатель; Reflector)
 2007 — Moya Lyubov (Моя любовь; My Love)
 2010 — Olimpia (Олимпия; Olympia)
 2014 — Bessmertnyy (Бессмертный; Immortal)
 2017 — Solntsu reshat''' (Солнцу решать; It's Up to the Sun)

 Compilations and reissues 
 2002 — Molodye Vetra (Pereizdanie) (Молодые ветра (Переиздание); Young Wind (Reissue))
 2005 — Inoplaneten (Pereizdanie) (Инопланетен (Переиздание); Extraterrestrial (Reissue))
 2006 — The Best
 2008 — 7 Let. Yubileinui (7 Лет. Юбилейный; 7 Years. Anniversary)
 2010 — Olympia (Podarochnoe izdanie) (Олимпия (Подарочное издание); Olympia (Gift Edition))
 2012 — Novaya kolekcia (Luchshie pesni) (Новая коллекция (Лучшие песни); New Collection (The Best Songs))
 2015 — Mp3play. Muzykal'naya kollektsiya (Mp3play. Музыкальная коллекция; Mp3play. Music Collection)

 Singles 
 2013 — Chernyj drug (Pervyj Internet Maksi Single 13.13.13.) (Черный друг (Первый Интернет Макси Сингл 13.13.13.); Black friend (first Internet Maxi Single 13.13.13.)
 2013 — Fanat (Vtoroy internet maksi-singl 13.13.13) (Фанат (Второй интернет макси-сингл 13.13.13); Fan (second Internet Maxi Single 13.13.13.)
 2013 — Lyubov' ne ub'yosh'(Tretiy internet maksi-singl 13.13.13) (Любовь не убьёшь (Третий интернет макси-сингл 13.13.13); You can't kill love (third Internet Maxi Single 13.13.13.)
 2016 — 41-y fashist (Internet maksi-singl) (41-й фашист (Интернет макси-сингл); The 41st Fascist (Internet Maxi Single)

 Videos 
 Molodye vetra (Молодые ветра; Young Wind) (2001)
 Osen` (Осень; Autumn) (2001)
 Inoplaneten (Инопланетен; Extraterrestrial) (2004)
 Zima (Зима; Winter) (2004)
 VIVA! (2004)
 Ya lyubov' (Я любовь; I am Love) (2004)
 Ulichnyi boets (Уличный боец; Street Fighter) (2006)
 Amfibiya (Амфибия; Amphibian) (2008)
 Ptitsa (Птица; Bird) (2009)
 Letim s voiny (Летим с войны; Flying Back from the War) (2011)
 Pomogi mne (Помоги мне; Help Me) (2011)
 Noch` na ekrane'' (Ночь на экране; Night on the Screen) (2012)

References

External links 
 Official Website
 7B on RussMus.Net

2001 establishments in Russia
Musical groups established in 2001
Musical groups from Moscow
Russian rock music groups